James Britton Harvey Jr. (born August 20, 1943) is a former professional American football player who played guard for six seasons for the Oakland Raiders.

References

1943 births
Living people
Players of American football from Jackson, Mississippi
American football offensive guards
Ole Miss Rebels football players
Oakland Raiders players
American Football League players